Ingeniero Maschwitz, known simply as Maschwitz, is a town in the Escobar Partido of the Buenos Aires Province, Argentina. It forms part of the urban conurbation of Greater Buenos Aires. This is the small town where International evangelist Luis Palau was born.

Attractions

Estancia Villanueva
Papa Francisco Park
Municipal museum
Plaza Emilio Mitre
Arenera bridge
Ingeniero Maschwitz railway station

External links

Escobar Partido
Populated places in Buenos Aires Province
Argentina
Cities in Argentina